1st Madras Pioneers may refer to:

61st Pioneers Which had the title in 1901, they later became the 1st Battalion, 1st Madras Pioneers in 1922
64th Pioneers which became the 2nd Battalion, 1st Madras Pioneers in 1922.
81st Pioneers which became the 10th (Training) Battalion, 1st Madras Pioneers in 1922.
106th Pioneers which became the 4th Hazara Pioneers, 1st Madras Pioneers in 1922.